Stéphane Richi Oméonga (born 27 March 1996) is a Belgian footballer who plays as a midfielder for Scottish Premiership club Livingston.

Career
Oméonga signed for Scottish Premiership club Hibernian in January 2019.

On 22 July 2019, he joined Jupiter Pro League club Cercle Brugge on loan, with an option to buy.

He rejoined Hibernian in January 2020. However, following the formal conclusion of the truncated Season 2019/20 in May, Omeonga returned to his parent club once more.

On 5 September 2020, Omeonga departed Serie A club Genoa, ending a three-year stint with the club.  Five days later he became a new Pescara player.

In August 2021, Oméonga joined Scottish Premiership club Livingston on a 2-year deal.

Personal life
Oméonga is of Congolese descent.

Career statistics

Club

References

External links

Belgian footballers
Belgian people of Democratic Republic of the Congo descent
Serie B players
Serie A players
Belgian Pro League players
1996 births
Living people
U.S. Avellino 1912 players
Genoa C.F.C. players
Hibernian F.C. players
Cercle Brugge K.S.V. players
Delfino Pescara 1936 players
Belgium under-21 international footballers
Belgium youth international footballers
Expatriate footballers in Italy
Expatriate footballers in Scotland
Belgian expatriate footballers
Association football midfielders
Scottish Professional Football League players
Livingston F.C. players